The Airbus A220 (formerly Bombardier CSeries) is a narrow-body airliner.  

A220 may also refer to:
 Aerotrek A220, light sport aircraft, two-seater taildragger
 Alpine A220, sportscar racing prototype
 A220, model of Mercedes-Benz A-Class cars
 A220 road, between Erith and Bexleyheath in the UK
 RFA Wave Victor (A220), a Wave-class fleet support tanker

See also
 List of highways numbered 220
 Mercedes-Benz 220 (disambiguation)
 220 (number) and related terms